Dranița River may refer to:

 Dranița, a tributary of the Camenca in Bacău County
 Dranița, a tributary of the Bârnărel in Suceava County